Sandvik is a surname. Persons with that name include:

 Astrid Sandvik (born 1939), Norwegian Alpine skier
 Fredmund Sandvik (born 1951), Norwegian politician
 Gro Sandvik (born 1942), Norwegian flautist
 Harald Sandvik (1911–1992), Norwegian military officer
 Helge Sandvik (born 1990), Norwegian footballer
 Hilde Sandvik (born 1970), Norwegian journalist
 Ingrid Sandvik (1921–1976) Norwegian politician
 Johannes Ø. Sandvik (1894–1978), Norwegian agronomist and civil servant
 Marit Sandvik (born 1956), Norwegian jazz singer
 Olav Sandvik (1925–2010), Norwegian veterinarian and civil servant
 Ole Mørk Sandvik (1875–1976), Norwegian educator
 Ossi Sandvik (born 1953), Finnish politician
 Pål Thonstad Sandvik (born 1967), Norwegian historian
 Paul Knutsen Barstad Sandvik (1847–1936), Norwegian educator and musician
 Runa Sandvik, Norwegian computer security expert
 Tore Sandvik, Norwegian orienteer
 Tore O. Sandvik (born 1969), Norwegian politician

See also
 Sandvik (disambiguation)

Surnames
Surnames of Norwegian origin